The Dutch Volleyball Association or in ( Dutch : Nederlandse Volleybalbond, NeVoBo ) is an organization founded in 1947 to govern the practice of volleyball in the Netherlands.

It organizes the men's and women 's championships, and places the men's and women's national team under its aegis .

The NeVoBo joined the FIVB in 1947.

Nevobo members 
This table show members and associations Evolution through years:

Region Divisions 
The Nevobo is traditionally divided into several regions, Today there are four, in the past there were more than ten. The current regions are:
Nevobo region North
Nevobo region East
Nevobo region West
Nevobo region South

References

External links
Official website ( in Dutch )
Worldofvolley.com 

Volleyball in the Netherlands
Netherlands
Volleyball